Kurt Karl-Heinrich Ahrens, also known as Kurt Ahrens Jr., (born 19 April 1940 in Braunschweig, Germany) is a former sports car racing and touring car racing driver who occasionally appeared in German Grand Prix races, mostly in Formula 2 cars.

His father, Kurt Ahrens Sr., was a German speedway champion who competed against his son for five years. Kurt Ahrens Jr. started in 1958 with a Cooper-Norton Formula 3 and won the German Formula Junior title in 1961 and 1963, when his father retired.

He then raced Formula 2 and was present when Jim Clark was killed at the Hockenheimring in 1968. Due to the long Nürburgring track, it was possible to take part in the German Grand Prix in Formula 2 cars. He participated mostly with Brabhams for the Caltex Racing team, and was invited to drive the Brabham-Repco F1 in the wet 1968 German Grand Prix.

In 1968, Ahrens Jr. joined the Porsche factory sports car team and shared victory with Jo Siffert in the 1969 Austrian 1000 km event. He co-drove the pole-setting Porsche 917 "long tail" at the 1969 24 Hours of Le Mans and the 1970 24 Hours of Le Mans, but neither car finished. In 1970, he partnered with Vic Elford to win the 1000km Nürburgring in a Porsche 908.

Ahrens retired after 1970, taking pride in never crashing in a race. He had suffered a high speed shunt in April 1970 while testing a long tail Porsche on a wet Ehra-Lessien, with the car disintegrating badly- the car went under the Armco barrier and broke in half (as they were known to do), leaving Ahrens strapped in the back.

Complete Formula One World Championship results 
(key)

Complete 24 Hours of Le Mans results

References

External links
 ahrens24.de
 Kurt Ahrens Jr. profile at The 500 Owners Association

1940 births
24 Hours of Le Mans drivers
European Formula Two Championship drivers
German Formula One drivers
German racing drivers
Living people
Sportspeople from Braunschweig
Racing drivers from Lower Saxony
World Sportscar Championship drivers
24 Hours of Daytona drivers

Porsche Motorsports drivers